Black Aggie is the folkloric name given to a statue formerly placed on the grave of General Felix Agnus in Druid Ridge Cemetery in Pikesville, Maryland. It is an unauthorized replica – rendered by Edward Ludwig Albert Pausch – of sculptor Augustus Saint-Gaudens' 1891 allegorical figure, popularly called Nirvana, at the Adams Memorial in Rock Creek Cemetery in Washington, D.C. The statue is of a somber seated figure in a cowl or shroud.

History
Beginning with its installation in 1926, the replica was surrounded by many urban legends, principally that someone spending a night in its lap would be haunted by the ghosts of those buried there; that the spirits of individuals buried at Druid Ridge would annually convene at the statue; that no grass would grow on the ground where the statue's shadow would lie during the daytime; or that the statue would animate itself during the night, whether by physically moving or by showing glowing red eyes.

These urban legends led to much unwelcome attention toward the statue; many people were caught breaking into the cemetery at night to visit it, and the pedestal was frequently vandalized. The Agnus family, disturbed by the attention the statue received, donated it to the Smithsonian in 1967. It sat for many years in storage at the National Museum of American Art (later named the Smithsonian American Art Museum) where an authorized recasting of the original Adams Memorial statue now sits.

Black Aggie was moved from her previous home at the museum to a courtyard behind the Dolley Madison House on Lafayette Square in Washington, D.C. where she currently stands. The bare, blank pedestal remains at the statue's former home at Druid Ridge Cemetery.

References

External links
In The Statue's Grip
The Legend of Black Aggie

American ghosts
Sculpture forgeries
Maryland folklore
Pikesville, Maryland
Sculptures in the United States
Vandalized works of art in Maryland